Craig Thomas Johnson (born March 18, 1972), is an American former professional ice hockey player who played 10 seasons in the National Hockey League (NHL). He was drafted 33rd overall by the St. Louis Blues in the 1990 NHL Entry Draft and went on to play 557 games in the NHL for the St. Louis Blues, Los Angeles Kings, Toronto Maple Leafs, Washington Capitals and the Mighty Ducks of Anaheim.

Internationally Johnson played for the American national team in several World Championships and the 1994 Winter Olympics.

Career
Johnson made his NHL debut during the 1994–95 season with St. Louis. He scored the first goal at the Kiel Center when it opened in 1995. On February 27, 1996, Johnson was traded with Patrice Tardif, Roman Vopat, and two draft picks to the Los Angeles Kings for Wayne Gretzky. He remained a King for another seven seasons until 2003, where he played for three teams during the 2003–04 season, the Toronto Maple Leafs, Washington Capitals, and Anaheim Ducks. During his tenure with the Kings, he wore number 23, making him the last player to wear the number until it was retired for Dustin Brown in 2023.

Johnson moved to Germany's Deutsche Eishockey Liga (DEL), signing with the Hamburg Freezers. After one season he signed with the DEG Metro Stars in Düsseldorf where he spent two seasons. In 2007, Johnson moved to Austria and signed with Red Bull Salzberg.

Johnson returned to the Orange County area and coached youth hockey at Santa Margarita Catholic High School and for the Anaheim Jr Ducks youth team. 
He was an assistant coach for the Ontario Reign in 2010–11 and joined the player development staff for the Los Angeles Kings in 2018. He returned to the Reign, now in the AHL, as assistant coach in 2020. He is working as co-head coach of the Reign with Chris Hajt.

Personal life
His son Ryan, a defenseman, was drafted in the first round by the Buffalo Sabres in the 2019 NHL Draft - he is currently playing at the University of Minnesota, Craig's Alma Mata.

Career statistics

Regular season and playoffs

International

Awards and honors

References

External links
 

1972 births
Living people
American men's ice hockey left wingers
DEG Metro Stars players
EC Red Bull Salzburg players
Hamburg Freezers players
Ice hockey coaches from Minnesota
Ice hockey people from Saint Paul, Minnesota
Ice hockey players at the 1994 Winter Olympics
Los Angeles Kings coaches
Los Angeles Kings players
Mighty Ducks of Anaheim players
Minnesota Golden Gophers men's ice hockey players
Olympic ice hockey players of the United States
Peoria Rivermen (IHL) players
Sportspeople from Saint Paul, Minnesota
St. Louis Blues draft picks
St. Louis Blues players
Toronto Maple Leafs players
Washington Capitals players
Worcester IceCats players